Molly was launched at Halifax, Nova Scotia, in 1783. From at least 1785 on she sailed from Lancaster as a West Indiaman. In 1792 she made one voyage as a Liverpool-based slave ship in the triangular trade in enslaved people. A French squadron captured her in 1794 at the outset of her second slave voyage, before she could acquire any slaves.

Career
Missing online issues of Lloyd's Register (LR) mean that Molly first appeared in the register in 1786, even though she had already appeared in Lloyd's List in 1785. For many years Lloyd's Register gave her origin as simply "Amer", though by the early 1790s it had switched to "Halifax".

1st slave voyage (1792–1793): Captain John Coulthard sailed from Liverpool on 28 September 1792, bound for West Africa. This was his first voyage as a captain. Unfortunately for him, he died on 27 February 1793. Captain Nehemiah Evans replaced Coulthard. Molly arrived at Kingston on 25 May 1793 with 134 slaves. She sailed for Liverpool on 19 July and arrived back there on 2 October. She had left Liverpool with 19 crew members and she had suffered 11 crew deaths on her voyage.

2nd slave voyage (1794–Loss): Captain John Sillars sailed from Liverpool on 5 July 1794.

Fate

Citations and references
Citations

References

1783 ships
Ships built in Nova Scotia
Age of Sail merchant ships of England
Liverpool slave ships
Captured ships